Gumrah (lit:to become astray), is a Pakistani romantic drama serial, that was first aired on 5 September 2017. Sabreen Hisbani and Faisal Rehman play main leads while Hina Altaf plays female antagonist. Komal Aziz Khan and Hammad Farooqui play 2nd main leads.

It is directed by Saima Waseem and written by Malik Khuda Bakhsh of Be Aitebaar.

Plot 
Huma and Faryal are best friends. Huma is always going to Faryal's house and wants the same lavish life Faryal does. Master Ijaz, Huma's father disapproves of this and believes that Faryal's parents and Faryal are making Huma greedy. Huma wants to have money and will do anything for it. She rejects Aliyan, Faryal's cousin because he is not as rich and will not meet her needs. Soon, Huma begins working at Faryal's father, Sarmad's company and ends up marrying him.

Cast

Main cast
 Sabreen Hisbani as Anum
 Komal Aziz Khan as Faryal
 Hina Altaf as Huma
 Hammad Farooqui as Aliyan
 Faisal Rehman as Sarmad

Recurring cast 
 Behroze Sabzwari as Master Ijaz
 Nida Mumtaz as Aapa
 Asad Siddiqui as Jamshed
 Beena Chaudhary as Farkhanda
 Awais Waseer
 Rashida Tabbassum

Reception 
The series went positive and popular due to the chemistry of Faisal and Hina. On 4 October, it delivered 44,900 viewers. For 8 October's episode, it delivered 30,700 viewers. For 17 October, it delivered 16,000 viewers. For 31 October, it delivered 32,400 viewers. For 7 November, the show delivered 20,300 viewers. For 15 November, the show gathered 42,800 viewers. For 22 November, the drama caught up with 52,300 viewers. Of 28 November episode, it got up with 35,700 viewers. Of 4 December, the show delivered 28,200 viewers. On 6 December, the show got 0.18% of share from Hum TV and delivered 64, 500 viewers. For 12 & 13 Episodes, it caught up with 20,500 and 30,100 viewers respectively. For 19 December, the channel once again remained at #2 and got 0.11% share catching 45,000 viewers. On 26 December, it was channel's most watched show with 33,400 viewers.

References 

Pakistani drama television series
2017 Pakistani television series debuts
2018 Pakistani television series endings
Urdu-language television shows
Hum TV original programming